The Charles M. White House is a historic home located at 403 Whitehall Circle, Paris, Henry County, Tennessee.

It was built in 1910 and added to the National Register in 1988.

References

Houses in Henry County, Tennessee